This is a list of submissions to the 79th Academy Awards for Best Foreign Language Film. The Academy of Motion Picture Arts and Sciences has invited the film industries of various countries to submit their best film for the Academy Award for Best Foreign Language Film every year since the award was created in 1956. The award is handed out annually by the Academy to a feature-length motion picture produced outside the United States that contains primarily non-English dialogue. The Foreign Language Film Award Committee oversees the process and reviews all the submitted films.

For the 79th Academy Awards, which were held on February 25, 2007, the Academy invited 83 countries to submit films for the Academy Award for Best Foreign Language Film, including Lithuania, which was invited to submit a film for the first time in the history of the Academy. Sixty-three countries submitted films to the Academy and sixty-one of those films were accepted for review by the Academy, a record number for the time. The submissions of Finland and Luxembourg were rejected before the formal review process.

Two rule changes were made for the 79th Academy Awards in regard to the Best Foreign Language Film process. The first was instituting a two-step process in choosing the nominees for the award in order to allow New York-based members of the Academy to participate. An initial committee would select nine films to form a shortlist in January that would then be reviewed by a committee composed of ten members of the initial committee, ten Los Angeles-based members, and ten New York-based members that would select the final five nominees. The second change was the removal of a rule requiring that the films be in an official language of the submitting country. This was done in response to the rejection of Italy's and Austria's submissions for the 78th Academy Awards, Private and Caché respectively, because they were not filmed in the official language of their respective countries. This allowed for the acceptance of submissions such as Canada's Water, which contained solely Hindi dialogue. Following the revealing of the shortlist, the Academy released a list of the five nominees on January 23, 2007. The winner of the Academy Award for Best Foreign Language Film was Germany's The Lives of Others, which was directed by Florian Henckel von Donnersmarck.

Submissions

Notes
  Finland's submission, Lights in the Dusk, was ejected before the formal review process because director Aki Kaurismäki withdrew the film from consideration.
  Luxembourg's submission, Your Name is Justine, was rejected before the formal review process because the Academy determined that not enough creative input was received from within Luxembourg for the film to meet the Academy's requirements.

References
General

 

Specific

External links
 Official website for the 79th Academy Awards

79